Gorka Brit Gallego (born 19 April 1978) is a Spanish former professional footballer who played as a striker.

He amassed Segunda División totals of 177 games and 59 goals over six seasons, in representation of Eibar, Salamanca, Numancia and Real Unión. In La Liga, he played with Numancia and Osasuna for a total of 48 matches.

Club career
Brit was born in San Sebastián, Gipuzkoa. Having grown through the ranks of Real Sociedad and played as a senior with modest clubs, mostly in the Basque Country, he made his debut in La Liga with CA Osasuna in the 2002–03 season. Subsequently, he served three loans in the Segunda División and, after only 17 games with the Navarrese's main squad over two separate campaigns, was released in summer 2006.

In 2007–08, Brit was an important member for CD Numancia in their championship-winning season after having joined the Soria side the previous year, contributing 26 matches and nine goals to this feat. Highlights included braces in 2–1 wins against Xerez CD (home) and UD Las Palmas (away).

Brit returned to the Basque region in late July 2009, signing for Real Unión who had recently promoted to the second tier. He experienced one of his best seasons as a professional by scoring 14 league goals, but the team was immediately relegated.

Honours
Numancia
Segunda División: 2007–08

References

External links

1978 births
Living people
Spanish footballers
Footballers from San Sebastián
Association football forwards
La Liga players
Segunda División players
Segunda División B players
Tercera División players
Real Sociedad B footballers
SD Beasain footballers
Atlético Levante UD players
Águilas CF players
CA Osasuna B players
CA Osasuna players
SD Eibar footballers
UD Salamanca players
CD Numancia players
Real Unión footballers